Wooden Alley is a historic wood block paved alley connecting Astor Street and State Street in the Near North Side neighborhood of Chicago, Illinois. This wood block technique is a derivative of Nicholson paving, a more durable method of wooden paving which replaced plank paving in many U.S. cities in the nineteenth century. First paved in 1909, the alley is one of only two wooden alleys remaining in Chicago. Wooden paving was common in the late nineteenth century in Chicago, as the city's large lumber market made wood much cheaper than other paving materials. By 1909, however, a decline in the lumber market combined with the increased durability of other paving materials had caused the city to turn away from wooden paving, making the alley an unusually late example of the method.

The alley was added to the National Register of Historic Places on May 22, 2002.

References

Roads on the National Register of Historic Places in Illinois
National Register of Historic Places in Chicago
Buildings and structures completed in 1909